Ann(e) Butler may refer to:

Ann Butler (painter), American painter
Anne Butler, Countess of Ormond
Annie Butler, English supercentenarian
Ann Butler (camogie); see All-Ireland Senior Club Camogie Championship 1980 
Anne Butler (engineer), Irish Engineer
Anne Butler (actress), British-born Canadian actress